Llysdinam is a hamlet located in Powys, Wales, to the west and near to the town of Llandrindod Wells.

History
The Llysdinam estate and hamlet were created by the Venables family around their Llysdinam House, in Newbridge-on-Wye, then in Breconshire. The estate passed through the family, including: Richard Venables (1774–1858), archdeacon of Carmarthen and vicar of Clyro from 1811 to 1846; and Richard Lister Venables (1809–1894), vicar of Clyro and Bettws Clyro. Following the marriage of Katherine Minna (born 1870) and Sir Charles Dillwyn-Venables-Llewellyn, 2nd Baronet, in 1893, the estate was added to the Penllergare and Ynis-y-gerwn estates in Glamorgan, already held by the Dillwyn-Llewelyn family.

From 1911, Sir Charles erected a series of bird nest boxes on the estate, which today number around 1,000. In the 1960s, Sir Michael Dillwyn-Venables-Llewelyn, the Lord Lieutenant of Radnorshire, formed both the educational Llysdinam Trust and the local county wildlife trust to preserve the estate.

Present
After the establishment of the trust, Cardiff University were approached to start a field centre within the estate's grounds but as of 2010 is pending closure 

References

Villages in Powys